Owain Glyndŵr's Parliament House was traditionally the building where Owain Glyndŵr held a parliament after being crowned Prince of Wales in 1404. However the origin of the building is probably later. The existing building may be 15th century in origin, but has been extensively rebuilt, particularly by David Davies of Llandinam, who purchased it in 1906. It was opened on 20 February 1912 to provide a social centre for the town. The present rubble exterior is an interpretation of its 15th century appearance, probably by the architect Frank Shayler, who may also have designed the adjacent Glyndŵr Institute.

Location
The Parliament House is located in the centre of the town and is set into a continuous row of frontages midway along Heol Maengwyn, opposite the entrance to Plas Machynlleth and to the left of the Owain Glyndwr Institute.

History

 
In about 1813, artist Edward Pugh visited Machynlleth, and in 1816, he published a fine coloured lithograph of Parliament House. He provides the following description of the building:

Architecture of the Parliament House 
The Parliament House, Machynlleth, is a substantial and remarkably complete hall-house sited parallel to the main road which approaches the town from the east. The hall-house has a four-unit plan: a storeyed outer room of two bays, an open passage (2 bays between partition trusses), an open hall (3 bays with dais-end partition), and a storeyed inner-room of two bays. The carpentry is refined: purlins and ridge are tenoned into the trusses. The principal rafters of each truss are unusually shaped ('extruded') to receive the tenoned collar. In the hall the purlins are moulded with two tiers of windbraces (replaced), and the trusses have shaped feet. The upper-end truss is set forward from the dais partition to form a shallow canopy. The site is traditionally associated with Owain Glyndŵr's Parliaments of 1402 and 1404 and was restored and extended in 1911 as a library and institute commemorating Glyndŵr. Tree-ring dating from timber in the building shows that it was felled in 1470, which is two generations later than the parliaments, but the origins of this substantial and important house may be considerably older. The interior is now an exhibition centre.

Frieze by Murray Urquhart 
One of the most important features of the Parliament House is a mural by Scottish artist Murray McNeel Caird Urquhart (1880–1972), showing scenes from the life of Owain Glyndŵr. It comprises a series of 4 large panels depicting scenes from his life, in particular the Battle of Hyddgen, fought on the slopes of nearby Pumlumon in June 1401. The mural was painted by Urquhart between 1912 and 1914. Urquhart trained in Edinburgh, London, and Paris.

The Glyndŵr Institute
The Glyndŵr Institute is located next to Parliament House at Nos. 80-88 Heol Maengwyn. It dates to 1911 and was built for Lord Davies of Llandiam, who bought two cottages on the site in 1909. It was probably designed by architect Frank Shayler, who undertook other similar work for Lord Davies. The design is that of an L-plan black and white Tudor revival building with a slate roof and stone chimney stacks. The left elevation of the building features a bay front with a broad bracketed gable, and diamond-leaded glazed windows with mullions and transoms. A two-storey porch in the centre features a similar gable design with overhanging eaves and a garlanded rainwater head. A cross-framed oriel window and pediment adorn the segmental-arched entrance with a boarded and studded door. The right elevation of the building features a three-storey tower with a pyramidal roof and tall weathervane. There is a pointed arch doorway to the tower, which features a dog-leg staircase and a partially-carved stone handrail inside. Other interior features include some half-timbered walls and a stone fireplace with half-round columns.

The building was listed Cadw Grade II in November 1990. Today it serves as a civic building and tourist office.

Gallery

See also

 Buildings associated with Owain Glyndŵr

Senedd building, headquarters of the devolved Senedd, Cardiff
Early Buildings in Montgomeryshire:
Ty Mawr, Castle Caereinion
Penarth (Newtown and Llanllwchaiarn)
Maesmawr Hall, Llandinam
Glas Hirfryn, Llansilin

References

Literature
Scourfield R. and Haslam R. (2013), The Buildings of Wales: Powys; Montgomeryshire, Radnorshire and Breconshire, Yale University Press.

External links

 Owain Glyndwr Centre, Machynlleth – official site
Entry on CPAT Archwilio 
Royal Commission-Coflein.
Entry on British Listed Buildings 

Houses in Powys
Buildings and structures in Powys
Vernacular architecture
Hall houses
Museums in Powys
Grade I listed buildings in Powys
Machynlleth
Welsh parliaments